Jean-Claude Dassier (born 28 July 1941 in Paris, France) is the president of Olympique de Marseille between June 2009 and June 2011. Before, he was a journalist and the news director of TF1.

References

Further reading
 

1941 births
Living people
Writers from Paris
Olympique de Marseille chairmen
French television journalists
French football chairmen and investors
French male non-fiction writers